Rhynchospora biflora, known by the common name of twoflower beaksedge, is a member of the sedge family, Cyperaceae. It is a perennial herb, found in rainforests of the Caribbean, Colombia, and Venezuela, as well as southeastern Brazil.

References

External links

biflora
Flora of South Brazil
Flora of Colombia
Flora of Cuba
Flora of the Dominican Republic
Flora of Jamaica
Flora of Haiti
Flora of Puerto Rico
Flora of Venezuela
Plants described in 1871